Stowe Hill Tunnel is a railway tunnel on the West Coast Main Line just south of the village of Weedon, Northamptonshire, England. The tunnel runs in a straight line underneath the A5 main road between Weedon and Towcester from about northwest to southeast. The next station southbound is Wolverton and northbound Rugby. The tunnel was opened in 1838 as a part of the London and Birmingham Railway.

During the 2000s, in preparation for the introduction of the British Rail Class 390 tilting trains, which would enable regular operating speeds of  along this section of the line, it was determined that the Stowe Hill tunnel would, without modification, cause such pressure changes to trains traversing it at high speed as to exceed passenger comfort levels. Accordingly, modifications to the tunnel were made in the form of four vertical pressure relief shafts being installed to provide sufficient mitigation; additional land around these new shafts was acquired, in some cases using compulsory purchase orders.

The tunnel was close to the site of the Weedon rail crashes in 1915 and 1951 in which a total of 25 people died, though was unconnected with the cause of either.

References

Rail transport in Northamptonshire
Buildings and structures in Northamptonshire
Railway tunnels in England
Tunnels in Northamptonshire
Tunnels completed in 1838